The men's competition in the light-heavyweight (– 85 kg) division was held on 23 and 24 September 2010.

Schedule

Medalists

Records

 Andrei Rybakou's world record was rescinded in 2016.

Results

References
Pages 35–36 

- Mens 85 kg, 2010 World Weightlifting Championships